ACM Transactions on Computer Systems is a quarterly peer-reviewed scientific journal published by the Association for Computing Machinery. According to SCImago Journal Rank (SJR), the journal h-index is ranked 70, ranking it to Q1 in Computer Science (miscellaneous).

References

External links

Systems journals